Fitton Gerard, 3rd Earl of Macclesfield (15 October 1663 – 26 December 1702) was a British peer, styled Hon. Fitton Gerard until 1701.

Biography
He was the younger son of Charles Gerard, 1st Earl of Macclesfield, and represented several constituencies, mostly in Lancashire, in the House of Commons of England, before succeeding his brother Charles Gerard, 2nd Earl of Macclesfield to the earldom in 1701. He was appointed a deputy lieutenant of Lancashire that year, but died in the following year, the earldom becoming extinct.

After his death, there was a long legal dispute between the Duke of Hamilton, and Lord Mohun over who should succeed to Gawsworth Hall and Macclesfield's estates. Hamilton's claim was through his wife, Elizabeth Gerard, a granddaughter of Charles Gerard, 1st Earl of Macclesfield, while Mohun's was as the named heir of his friend Charles Gerard, 2nd Earl of Macclesfield. On 15 November 1712, the two men fought a famous duel in Hyde Park, Westminster, described in Thackeray's The History of Henry Esmond and in Bernard Burke's Anecdotes of the Aristocracy.

References

1663 births
1702 deaths
Deputy Lieutenants of Lancashire
Gerard, Fitton
English MPs 1690–1695
English MPs 1695–1698
English MPs 1698–1700
Fitton
Earls of Macclesfield
Members of the Parliament of England (pre-1707) for Lancashire